The Nordic Patent Institute (NPI) is an intergovernmental organisation established by the governments of Denmark, Iceland and Norway. It is based in Taastrup, Denmark. Since January 1, 2008, the Institute acts as Patent Cooperation Treaty (PCT) authority. As of May 1, 2013, it is, with the European Patent Office and the Swedish Patent and Registration Office, one of the three International Searching Authorities (ISA) and International Preliminary Examining Authorities (IPEA) available for international applications filed with the Receiving Offices of Denmark, Iceland, Norway and Sweden. It also carries out Supplementary International Searches in Danish, English, Icelandic, Norwegian and Swedish.

Its two-letter code is XN.

Nordic Patent Institute also performs patent search and analysis on a commercial basis for companies and IP law firms.

See also 
 Danish Patent and Trademark Office
 Norwegian Industrial Property Office
 Visegrad Patent Institute

References

External links 
 Nordic Patent Institute
 Nordic Patent Institute on the Danish Patent and Trademark Office web site

Patent offices
International Searching and Preliminary Examining Authorities